NTPA may refer to:
 North Texas Philosophical Association, an organization dedicated to the quality of philosophy teaching in North Texas
 National Tractor Pullers Association, the US tractor pulling governing body